István Angyal (18 October 1914 – 1 October 1980) was a Hungarian swimmer. He competed in two events at the 1936 Summer Olympics.

References

1914 births
1980 deaths
Hungarian male swimmers
Olympic swimmers of Hungary
Swimmers at the 1936 Summer Olympics
Place of birth missing